The Namibia Qualifications Authority (NQA) is a statutory body in Namibia, regulated in terms of the National Qualifications Framework Act No 29 of 1996. It is made up of 29 members appointed by the Minister of Education in consultation with the Minister of Labour. The NQA is mandated by legislation to oversee the development and implementation of the National Qualifications Framework (NQF).

Functions
The NQA has the following legislative obligations:

 To set up and administer a national qualifications framework
 Set the occupational standards for any occupation, job, post or positions in any career structure
 Set the curriculum standards for achieving the occupational standards
 Promote the development of, or analyse, benchmarks of acceptable performance norms for any occupation, job or position 
 Accredit persons, institutions and organisations providing education and courses of instruction or training
 Evaluate and recognise competencies learnt outside formal education
 Be a forum on matters pertaining to qualifications
 Establish facilities for the collection and dissemination of information in connection with matters pertaining to qualifications
 Enquire into whether any particular qualification meets the national standards
 Advise any person, body, institution, organisation or interest group on matters pertaining to qualifications and national standards for qualifications.

References

External links
Homepage: Namibia Qualifications Authority

1996 establishments in Namibia
Education in Namibia
Government of Namibia